Vassegara may refer to:

"Vaseegara", a song sung by Bombay Jayashree from the 2001 Tamil film Minnale
Vaseegara (film), a 2003 Tamil film directed by K. Selvabharathi By Abhinraj